Pacheco is a Portuguese and Spanish name which may refer to:

General
Alex Pacheco (born 1958), animal rights activist, co-founder of PETA.
Ángel Pacheco (general) (1793-1869), was an Argentine military officer trained by José de San Martín who later became one of the top commanders in the Confederacy during the dictatorship of Juan Manuel de Rosas. He never lost a battle under his command.
Bernardo de Miera y Pacheco (1713-1785), Spanish cartographer and artist
Cosme Pacheco (c.1803–c.1851), Peruvian cavalry officer, in military campaigns for the independence of Peru, 1821-1825 
Duarte Pacheco Pereira (c. 1460–1533), Portuguese sea captain, soldier, explorer and cartographer
José Francisco Pacheco (born 1951), Portuguese educator
Juan Manuel Fernández Pacheco (1650-1725), Spanish aristocrat, politician, academician and general
María Pacheco Padilla (c.1496-1531), Spanish military defender of the city of Toledo
Rafael Pacheco (born 1954), Spanish astronomer
Rodrigo Pacheco, 3rd Marquess of Cerralvo (c. 1565-1652), Spanish nobleman, inquisitor of Valladolid, and viceroy

In arts and entertainment
Alexis Mateo Pacheco (born 1979), Puerto Rican drag queen
Ana Maria Pacheco (born 1943), Brazilian artist 
Arturo Pacheco Altamirano (1903–1978), Chilean painter
Carlos Pacheco (born 1962), Spanish comic book artist
Fernando Castro Pacheco (1918-2013), Mexican painter
Fernando González Pacheco (1932-2014), Colombian television presenter
Francisco Pacheco, (1564–1644) Spanish painter and writer on art theory
Francisco Pacheco (born 1955), Venezuelan singer
Johnny Pacheco (1935-2021), Dominican musician, composer, producer and bandleader. Creator of Fania All-Stars. Coined the term "Salsa"
"Mizzy" Pacheco (21st century), former lead singer of the American alternative rock band Against All Will
Richard Pacheco (born 1948), American pornographic actor, real name Howie Gordon
Tom Pacheco, (born 1946) American singer and songwriter
Joaquín Monserrat (1921-1996), known as Pacheco, Spanish comedian and host of children programs
María Luisa Pacheco (1919-1982), was a Bolivian painter and mixed-media artist who emigrated to the United States.

Writers
Agustín Díaz Pacheco (born 1952), Spanish writer 
Ibéyise Pacheco (born 1961), Venezuelan journalist and writer 
Jesús López Pacheco (1930-1997), Spanish-Canadian writer
José Emilio Pacheco (1939-2014), was a Mexican poet, essayist, novelist and short story writer
Luis Pacheco de Narváez (1570-1640), Spanish writer on fencing
Luiz Pacheco (1925-2008), was a writer, publisher, polemicist and literary critic (mainly Portuguese literature).

Politicians
Abel Pacheco (born 1933), Costa Rican politician and former President
 Abel Pacheco Junior (born 1987), American politician
Bob Pacheco (born 1934), American politician
Gregorio Pacheco (1823-1899), Bolivian politician and former President
Ivonne Ortega Pacheco (born 1972),  Mexican politician
Jorge Pacheco Areco (1920-1998), Uruguayan politician and former President
José Andrés Pacheco de Melo (1779- approx. 1820), Argentine statesman and priest
José Condungua Pacheco (born 1958), Mozambican politician
José Pacheco Pereira (born 1949), Portuguese politician and historian
Juan Pacheco (1419-1474), Castilian noble
Lopo Fernandes Pacheco (died 1349), Portuguese noble
Marc Pacheco (born 1952), American politician
Nick Pacheco (born 1964), American politician
Rod Pacheco (born 1958), American politician
Romualdo Pacheco (1831-1899), American politician
Rubén Pacheco, Costa Rican politician
Rubén Pacheco, Venezuelan diplomat
Víctor Cervera Pacheco (1936-2004), Mexican politician

Athletes
Alex Pacheco (born 1973), Venezuelan baseball player
Alfredo Pacheco (1982-2015), Salvadoran footballer
Andrei Pacheco (born 1984), footballer from Trinidad and Tobago
Antonio Pacheco D'Agosti (born 1976), Uruguayan footballer
Augusto Pacheco Fraga (born 1988), Brazilian footballer
Dani Pacheco (born 1991), Spanish footballer
Darwin Pacheco (born 1976), Honduran footballer
Edgar Pacheco (born 1977), Portuguese footballer
Édgar Pacheco (born 1990), Mexican footballer
Eduardo Pacheco (born 1987), Brazilian footballer
Fábio Pacheco (born 1988), Portuguese footballer
Ferdie Pacheco (1927-2017), United States boxing physician
Henrique Pacheco Lima (born 1985), Brazilian footballer
Irene Pacheco (born 1971), Colombian boxer
Isiah Pacheco (born 1999), American football player
Jaime Pacheco (born 1958), Portuguese football manager
Joilla (born 1974), Venezuelan footballer 
Maz Pacheco (born 1998), English footballer
Nilton Pacheco (1920-2013), Brazilian basketball player
Raúl Pacheco (born 1979), Peruvian long-distance runner
Rodrigo Pacheco (badminton) (born 1983), Peruvian badminton player
Rommel Pacheco (born 1986), Mexican diver
Tony Pacheco, multiple people
Víctor Pacheco (born 1974), Colombian footballer
Vinícius Pacheco (born 1985), Brazilian footballer

References 

Portuguese-language surnames
Spanish-language surnames